Allan Francis (born 3 May 1971) is a Canadian fencer. He competed in the team épée event at the 1992 Summer Olympics.

References

External links
 

1971 births
Living people
Canadian male fencers
Olympic fencers of Canada
Fencers at the 1992 Summer Olympics
People from Northern Sunrise County
Sportspeople from Alberta
20th-century Canadian people